St Margaret's Church is a parish church in the village of Horsmonden, Kent, England. It is a Grade I listed building.

Building 
St Margaret's Church is set in a farmyard, some distance from Horsmonden.

The building is constructed of sandstone and roofed in Welsh slate, which replaced a former roof of clay tiles in the late 19th century. During the 18th century the roof was covered in wooden shingles.

History 
The building of the current church was started around 1260, on the site of a former Norman building which dated back to around 1100. Henry de Grofhurst, rector from 1311 until his death in 1361, was mostly responsible for building St Margaret's Church. He is memorialised in a brass in the centre of the chancel.

Burials and memorials 
On the south wall is a memorial bust to the 19th century inventor, John Read, responsible for the round oast-house, the stomach pump and a tobacco enema.

Gallery

See also 
 Horsmonden
 List of churches in Kent

References 

Church of England church buildings in Kent
Grade I listed churches in Kent
Grade I listed buildings in Kent